Ferguson Township is a township with home rule status in Centre County, Pennsylvania, United States. It is part of the State College, Pennsylvania Metropolitan Statistical Area. The population was 19,009 at the 2020 census.  Most of the agricultural research for Pennsylvania State University (Penn State), based in adjacent State College, Pennsylvania, is taking place at the Russell E. Larson Research Center located in the western part of Ferguson Township. The headquarters of AccuWeather are also located within the township.

Ferguson Township is served by the Ferguson Township Police Department and the Alpha Fire Company for police and fire protection.

History
The Bucher Ayres Farm was added to the National Register of Historic Places in 1980.

The township adopted a home rule charter in May 1974, effective January 5, 1976, retaining "Township of Ferguson" as its official name. Despite the "Township" designation, Ferguson is no longer governed under the state's Township Code.

Geography

Ferguson Township is bordered by Halfmoon Township and Patton townships to the northwest, the borough of State College and College Township to the northeast, Harris Township to the east and Huntingdon County to the south.

Demographics

As of the census of 2010, there were 17,690 people, 7,195 households, and 4,192 families residing in the township. The population density was 367.8 people per square mile (141.9/km2). There were 7,501 housing units at an average density of 155.9 per square mile (60.2/km2). The racial makeup of the township was 82.0% White, 3.2% Black or African American, 0.1% Native American, 11.4% Asian, 1.0% from other races, and 2.3% from two or more races. Hispanics or Latinos of any race were 3.0% of the population.

There were 7,195 households, out of which 26.9% had children under the age of 18 living with them, 49.7% were married couples living together, 2.4% had a male householder with no wife present, 6.2% had a female householder with no husband present, and 41.7% were non-families. 25.8% of all households were made up of individuals, and 6.8% had someone living alone who was 65 years of age or older. The average household size was 2.45 and the average family size was 2.94.

The age distribution was 19.6% under 18, 18.0% from 18 to 24, 27.4% from 25 to 44, 23.0% from 45 to 64, and 12.0% who were 65 or older. The median age was 33 years. For every 100 females, there were 102.8 males. For every 100 females age 18 and over, there were 102.3 males.

The median income for a household in the township was $57,459, and the median income for a family was $72,339.  The per capita income for the township was $31,016. About 5.6% of families and 15.6% of the population were below the poverty line, including 11.7% of those under age 18 and 2.0% of those age 65 or over.

Government
The Township of Ferguson is governed by a five-member Board of Supervisors with two serving at-large and three serving by ward. Supervisors each serve four-year terms for a maximum of two-terms before a minimum two-year break. The Supervisors are chosen by plurality elections every two years alternating between at-large and ward elections. 

The Township of Ferguson is represented in the Pennsylvania General Assembly by Senate, District 35 and House District 77. Federally, the Township of Ferguson is part of Pennsylvania's 15th congressional district.

References

External links
Ferguson Township official website
Parks in Ferguson Township

Home Rule Municipalities in Pennsylvania
Home Rule Municipalities in Centre County, Pennsylvania
Populated places established in 1791